Rhodohypoxis is a small genus of tuberous  flowering plants in the family Hypoxidaceae, native to southern Africa (South Africa, Lesotho, Eswatini). Some species are in cultivation.

Description and distribution

Rhodohypoxis species grow from small tubers. They flower in the summer and die down in the winter. The flowers are white, pink or red; the bases of the tepals bend inwards, so that the stamens and ovary are not visible. Rhodohypoxis species are found in the eastern part of southern Africa, particularly in the Drakensberg mountains in the province of KwaZulu-Natal and Lesotho. This is a region of summer rainfall with relatively dry winters.

Species
 Rhodohypoxis baurii (Baker) Nel - South Africa, Lesotho, Eswatini
 Rhodohypoxis deflexa Hilliard & B.L.Burtt - Cape Province, Lesotho, KwaZulu-Natal
 Rhodohypoxis incompta Hilliard & B.L.Burtt - Lesotho, KwaZulu-Natal
 Rhodohypoxis milloides (Baker) Hilliard & B.L.Burtt - Cape Province, KwaZulu-Natal
 Rhodohypoxis rubella (Baker) Nel - Cape Province, Lesotho, KwaZulu-Natal
 Rhodohypoxis thodiana (Nel) Hilliard & B.L.Burtt - Lesotho, KwaZulu-Natal

Cultivation

Rhodohypoxis baurii is not uncommon in cultivation. It is not reliably frost hardy, so is often grown in pots, protected in the winter. Various colour forms are available under cultivar names, e.g. 'Ruth' (pure white), 'Allbrighton' (pink) and 'Douglas' (red). Some other species, such as R. milloides, and hybrids with Hypoxis species are also grown.

References

Asparagales genera
Flora of Southern Africa